José Caro may refer to:

 José María Caro Martínez (1830–1916), mayor of Pichilemu, Chile
 José María Caro Rodríguez (1866–1958), his son, Chilean cardinal
 José Armando Caro (1910–1985), Argentine politician
 José Antonio Caro (footballer, born 1993), Spanish football defender
 José Antonio Caro (footballer, born 1994), Spanish football goalkeeper